Hope Garden may refer to:

 Hope Garden in Saint Andrew Parish Jamaica on the campus of the University of the West Indies (Jamaica)
 Hope Garden in Manhattan's Battery Park